These are the official results of the Men's 110 metres Hurdles event at the 1997 IAAF World Championships in Athens, Greece. There were a total number of 47 participating athletes, with two semi-finals, four quarter-finals and six qualifying heats and the final held on Thursday August 7, 1997.

Medalists

Final

Semi-finals
Held on Wednesday 1997-08-06

Quarterfinals
Held on Tuesday 1997-08-05

Qualifying heats
Held on Tuesday 1997-08-05

See also
 1995 Men's World Championships 110m Hurdles (Gothenburg)
 1996 Men's Olympic 110m Hurdles (Atlanta)
 1998 Men's European Championships 110m Hurdles (Budapest)
 1999 Men's World Championships 110m Hurdles (Seville)
 2000 Men's Olympic 110m Hurdles (Sydney)

References
 Results

H
Sprint hurdles at the World Athletics Championships